A statue of Christopher Columbus was installed in San Antonio, Texas, United States.

History
The statue was removed in 2020.

See also

 List of monuments and memorials removed during the George Floyd protests

References

Monuments and memorials in Texas
Monuments and memorials to Christopher Columbus
Outdoor sculptures in San Antonio
Sculptures of men in Texas
Statues in Texas
San Antonio
Statues removed in 2020